Hendrik Scheffer (The Hague, 25 September 1798 – Paris, 15 March 1862) was a Dutch painter in the Romantic tradition who lived in France for most of his life. In France he is usually known as Henri Scheffer.

Personal life
Scheffer was the younger brother of painter Ary Scheffer, son of Johann Baptist and Cornelia Scheffer and grandson of Arie Lamme. When his father died in 1809, his mother first moved to Brussels and in 1811 to Paris.

His daughter Cornélie married French philosopher Ernest Renan. Their son Ary Renan also became a painter.

Work
Scheffers, like his brother Ary, was a pupil of Pierre-Narcisse Guérin.

His work was much sought after in his lifetime. He mainly painted genre pieces and portraits which were finely crafted. His work was exhibited at the Salon from 1824 onwards and was heavily criticised by Charles Baudelaire and Théophile Gautier.

Scheffers best known work is probably a picture portraying the arrest of Charlotte Corday (now in the Musée Lambinet), some selected others:
 Louis-Joseph de Vendôme (now in the musée de Vendôme)
 François Arago, the basis for the well known engraving by Alexandre Vincent Sixdeniers
 Armand Carrel
 Casimir Delavigne (now in musée national du château et des Trianons, in the Palace of Versailles)
 Ernest Renan (now in the Musée de la Vie Romantique)
 Augustin Thierry

Selected other works:
An Inundation in Rome
Joan of Arc entering Orléans (now in Versailles)
Hermann and Dorothea
Madame Roland
Preaching after the Revocation of the Edict of Nantes
The Battle of Cassel (now in Versailles)
The dream of Charles IX in the night of St. Bartholomew, based on the St. Bartholomew's Day massacre

His work has been copied many times in engravings.

The Dordrechts Museum has a section dedicated to the work of the Scheffers (mainly his brother Ary).

Students
Pierre Puvis de Chavannes studied with him for a time.

Awards
He was made a Chevalier in the Legion of Honor on 8 August 1837.

Gallery

References

Attribution:

External links

  Hendrik Scheffer on the DBNL website

1798 births
1861 deaths
19th-century Dutch painters
Dutch male painters
Artists from The Hague
19th-century Dutch male artists